Drygalski Glacier was on Mount Kilimanjaro in Tanzania, on the northwest slope of the peak. The Great Penck Glacier once flanked Drygalski Glacier to the south and until recently, the Credner Glacier did as well to the north. Drygalski Glacier is named for German geographer Erich von Drygalski.

See also
Retreat of glaciers since 1850
List of glaciers in Africa

References

Glaciers of Tanzania